Metanarsia modesta is a moth of the family Gelechiidae. It is found in southern Italy, Romania, Ukraine, Turkey, Armenia, north-eastern Iran, Iraq, Turkmenistan, Uzbekistan, Russia (the southern and south-eastern European part), and south-eastern and northern Kazakhstan. The habitat consists of steppes.

The length of the forewings is 6–10 mm. The forewings are light grey, mottled with brown scales. The hindwings are light grey. Adults are on wing from early May to late July.

References

Moths described in 1871
Metanarsia
Moths of Europe
Moths of Asia